Kishavisheh-ye Sofla (also Romanized as Kīshāvīsheh-ye Soflá; also known as Kashāvasheh, Kasha-Veshakh, Keshaweshah, and Khashavar) is a village in Tula Rud Rural District, in the Central District of Talesh County, Gilan Province, Iran. At the 2006 census, its population was 836, in 187 families.

References 

Populated places in Talesh County